Peter Woit (born September 11, 1957) is an American theoretical physicist.  He is a senior lecturer in the Mathematics department at Columbia University.  Woit, a critic of string theory, has published a book Not Even Wrong (2006) and writes a blog of the same name.

Career
Woit graduated in 1979 from Harvard University with bachelor's and master's degrees in physics. He obtained his PhD in particle physics from Princeton University in 1985, followed by postdoctoral work in theoretical physics at State University of New York at Stony Brook and mathematics at the Mathematical Sciences Research Institute (MSRI) in Berkeley.  He spent four years as an assistant professor at Columbia.  He now holds a permanent position in the mathematics department, as senior lecturer and as departmental computer administrator.

Woit is a U.S. citizen and also has a Latvian passport. His father was born in Riga and became exiled with his own parents at the beginning of the Soviet occupation of Latvia.

Criticism of string theory
He is critical of string theory on the grounds that it lacks testable predictions and is promoted with public money despite its failures so far, and has authored both scientific papers and popular polemics on this topic. His writings claim that excessive media attention and funding of this one particular mainstream endeavour, which he considers speculative, risks undermining public faith in the freedom of scientific research. His moderated weblog on string theory and other topics is titled "Not Even Wrong", a  derogatory term for scientifically useless arguments coined by Wolfgang Pauli.

"The String Wars"
A discussion in 2006 took place between University of California, Santa Barbara physicists at the Kavli Institute for Theoretical Physics and science journalist George Johnson regarding the controversy caused by the books of Lee Smolin (The Trouble with Physics) and Woit (Not Even Wrong).  The meeting was titled "The String Wars".

Selected publications
1988, "Supersymmetric quantum mechanics, spinors and the standard model," Nuclear Physics B303: 329-42.
1990, "Topological quantum theories and representation theory" in Ling-Lie Chau and Werner Nahm, eds., Differential Geometric Methods in Theoretical Physics: Physics and Geometry, Proceedings of NATO Advanced Research Workshop. Plenum Press: 533-45.
2006. Not Even Wrong: The Failure of String Theory & the Continuing Challenge to Unify the Laws of Physics.  (Jonathan Cape),  (Basic Books)
 2017 Quantum Theory, Groups and Representations Springer International Publishing, Hardcover , eBook ,

See also
 The Trouble with Physics
 Lee Smolin

References

External links 

 Peter Woit's Home Page.
 Not Even Wrong, Woit's weblog.
 Video of discussion/debate with Peter Woit on Bloggingheads.tv

1957 births
Harvard College alumni
Princeton University alumni
Columbia University faculty
21st-century American physicists
American bloggers
American people of Latvian descent
Living people
Science bloggers
Harvard Graduate School of Arts and Sciences alumni